Owethu Mbira (born 6 March 1987) is a South African professional boxer who competed from 2008 to 2011. As an amateur, he won a bronze medal at lightweight at the 2007 All-Africa Games.

Career
At the 2007 All-Africa Games in Algiers, he upset local Hamza Kramou but was defeated by Saifeddine Nejmaoui of Tunisia.

At the World Championships he lost to Georgian Vasil Qazishvili.

References
 
 

1987 births
Living people
Lightweight boxers
South African male boxers
African Games bronze medalists for South Africa
African Games medalists in boxing
Competitors at the 2007 All-Africa Games
21st-century South African people